Disown is a four-piece Industrial rock band originally from Cleveland, Ohio.

Along with guitar riffs and stabbing electronic synths similar to Nine Inch Nails or Linkin Park, Disown adds an arrangement of melodic, emotional lyrics similar to A Perfect Circle or Tool. 
 
Formed in 2000, Disown has shared the stage with HIM, Atreyu, Lacuna Coil, Static-X, Orgy, Godhead, Crossbreed, Mushroomhead, Trust Company, KMFDM and The Apex Theory.

The original lineup consisted of Joe Rover on vocals and guitar, Mitch Langford on guitar and sequencing, Jesse Rohrer on bass, and Gerry Lakarosky on drums.

In 2004, Disown appeared in an article of the Daily Kent Stater written by Mark Bodkin documenting the recording process of their first release "Angels and Atheists." Later that same year, they traveled to the Recording Workshop in Chillicothe, Ohio to demo three songs with Eric Rickey that would later appear on "Requiem of One." That same year, Disown replaced drummer, Gerry Lakarosky with Scott Kaczmarek.
 
In 2005, Disown secured a spot on the OzzFest 2004 tour performing in front of more than 30,000 people.
 
In 2005, the band secured business with Cleopatra Records and had their single, "Policy of Truth" placed on a tribute to Depeche Mode.

In 2006, Disown began their east coast tour of 13 states and 39 cities. The band acquired new bassist, Krystle Carter and guitarist Mikal. The band continued to open for several huge National Acts. As well, Disown was named Top 20 best artist on Myspace and selected for a chance to place a track on Vivendi/Universal's upcoming PC game, Scarface: The World Is Yours.

In 2007, Joe Rover began working on Disown's 3rd full-length Album entitled "Grave New World". Disown received sponsorship by Sam Ash Music and endorsements from Halo Guitars. The band was also nominated for Best Goth/Industrial Act 3 years in a row by the Cleveland Free Times.
 
In 2008, tragedy struck on March 4, as their guitarist, Mikal, was involved in a fatal car accident in Michigan, and died on March 6, 2008. Mikal's funeral was held on March 11. The band members refused to comment on the situation

2009 - the band has been in under the radar since, taking a break to recover from things and, perhaps enjoy life a bit.

2010, the band's music, specifically the track Medicinal, is set to appear as one of the tracks shipped with APB by Realtime Worlds. It is unclear whether this track was handpicked by the developers or submitted by the band via the Artist Program.

Members
Joe Rover - Vocals & Guitar
Dave Moore - Guitars
Krystle Carter - Bass
Scott Kaczmarek - Drums

Past Members

Mikal - Guitars
Mitch Langford - Guitars & Keyboards
Jesse Rohrer - Bass
Gerry Lakarosky - Drums
Chuck Eddy - Guitars
Mark Keith - Bass

Releases

Requiem of One (2005)
Unto You
Mary Lies Bleeding
The Dust of Sin
Policy of Truth (Depeche Mode cover)	
Medicinal	
Undeniably So	
Far Away from Here	
What Have I Become?	
INRI	
The Eleventh Hour	
Requiem of One	
Epitaph

Angels and Atheists (2001)
Guilt Trip	
Dead Inside	
Judas	
No Conclusion	
If I Were God	
A Perfect World	
Beautifully Sickening	
Stab	
All That Remains	
Still Here	
I Disappear

Notes

External links
 Disown on Myspace Music
 Disown on CDBaby
 Disown on Vampirefreaks

Heavy metal musical groups from Ohio
Musical groups from Cleveland